Dhandowal is a small village, located near Tehsil Shahkot, Jalandhar District, Punjab. This village is situated one kilometer east of Shahkot. Dhandowal is administered by the Gram Panchayat. Many of the villagers have immigrated to various countries: UK, Canada, France, Australia,NEW ZEALAND . Most of the people in this village have the surname Badesha or Chatha. It was a ruling Jagir of Badesha Jats.

Geography 
Dhandowal is located at 31°4'40" N, 75°21'5" E. Postal Code for Dhandowal is 144702.It is located 41 km to the south of the district headquarters of Jalandhar. 1 km from Shahkot. 167 km from State capital Chandigarh

Kotla Suraj Mal (1 km), Saidpur Jhiri (2 km), Laksian (3 km), Kanian Kalan (3 km), Dabri (3 km) are the nearby villages to Dhandowal. Dhandowal is surrounded by Nakodar Tehsil to the east, Lohian Tehsil to the west, Sultanpur Lodhi Tehsil to the north, Sidhwan Bet Tehsil to the south.

Jalandhar Cantt., Nakodar, Jandiala, Kapurthala are the nearby cities to Dhandowal.It many facilities centre like Verka Milk Plant,Electricity House,clinic,playground and gym as well.There are two Gurudwaras located in Dhandowal.It is a very beautiful village with facilities as same of town.

Schools and colleges
 Mata Sahib Kaur Kh. Senior Secondary School
 Government Primary School
 Mata Sahib Kaur College

References

Villages in Jalandhar district